Ococias Kyoto AC (Okoshiyasu Kyōto Eshi) is a Japanese professional football club based in Kyoto, Kyoto Prefecture, that competes in Kansai Soccer League, as part of Japanese Regional Leagues.

History
The club was founded in 1993.

The club split off from the original Kyoto Shiko Club when it professionalized and became today's Kyoto Sanga FC.

The club now features in Kansai Soccer League, part of Japanese Regional Leagues. The club name was Amitie SC Kyoto until 2017 season. From 2018 season, the club name was changed to Ococias Kyoto AC.

Club name

1994–1999: Kyoiku Kenkyusya SC
2000: FC Kyoken
2001: FC Kyoken Kyoto
2002–2009: FC Kyoto Bamb 1993
2010: Amitie SC Kyoto
2011–2014: Amitie SC
2015–2017: Amitie SC Kyoto
2018–: Ococias Kyoto AC

Current squad

References

External links
 
 
 

Football clubs in Japan
1994 establishments in Japan
Sports teams in Kyoto Prefecture